The Democratic Action Party was a political party in Malta.

History
The party was established in 1947 as a revived Maltese Political Union. It won four seats in the elections that year. However, it was reduced to just a single seat in the 1950 elections, and was dissolved shortly thereafter.

Ideology
The party was a grouping of landowners and professionals who sought to oppose economic and social reforms. It also supported protecting the interests of the Catholic church.

References

Defunct political parties in Malta
Political parties established in 1947
1947 establishments in Malta
Catholic political parties